Saint-Jean-sur-Richelieu public transit (transport en commun) is operated on behalf of the city of Saint-Jean-sur-Richelieu in the province of Quebec, Canada. Gestrans is the contracted manager of the transportation system with the buses for both local and commuter services being operated by Transdev.

Services
Intercity bus routes operate between Terminus Carrefour Richelieu at 600, rue Pierre-Caisse in Saint-Jean-sur-Richelieu and Terminus Centre-Ville located at 1000 de La Gauchetière in Downtown Montreal, with direct access there to the Bonaventure station on the Montreal Metro. Six routes provide local bus service for the core areas of Saint-Jean-sur-Richelieu, Saint-Luc, Iberville, Saint-Athanase and L'Acadie. There is also a taxibus system which operates within designated sectors and synchronizes with the scheduled routes.

The City of Saint-Jean-sur-Richelieu is the agency mandated to provide transportation for people with disabilities throughout the Region of Haut-Richelieu. To be eligible, interested individuals must first submit a request to that effect and attach the required documents.

Future plans include expanding operations within the current service area, the possible introduction of connections to other centres within Haut-Richelieu and a link to the city of Chambly.

Bus routes

See also 
 Exo bus services

References

Bus transport in Quebec
Transit agencies in Quebec
Transport in Saint-Jean-sur-Richelieu